Castle Road is one of the 15 constituencies of the Central and Western District Council. The seat elects one member of the council every four years. The seat was held by Cheng Lai-king of the Democratic Party of Hong Kong from 1994 to 2021.

The boundary loosely covers the Mid-levels area with estimated population of 20,397.

Councillors represented

Election results

2010s

2000s

1990s

Notes

Citations

References
2011 District Council Election Results (Central & Western)
2007 District Council Election Results (Central & Western)
2003 District Council Election Results (Central & Western)
1999 District Council Election Results (Central & Western)
 

Constituencies of Hong Kong
Constituencies of Central and Western District Council
1994 establishments in Hong Kong
Constituencies established in 1994
Mid-Levels